Saint Petersburg Toy Museum is a non-state cultural establishment.

History 
The Saint-Petersburg Toy Museum is a member of the Union of Museums of Russia. It was established in 1997 as a non-state cultural establishment, subsidised by private companies. It is the second museum of toys in Russia after the oldest artistic-educational museum of that kind in Sergiev Posad near Moscow, which treats pedagogic problems mainly.

The Saint-Petersburg Toy Museum was established as an artistic museum with the main task of collecting, storing, exposing and studying toys not only as a unique item of material culture, but also as a unique art form, that includes ancient national traditions and the most recent artistic tendencies.

The toy as an art form, existing as both a functional play-thing and an aesthetic object, inspired the collection.

However artistic toys are not the only direction of activity of the Saint-Petersburg Museum. The museum has collections of folk toys (both the Russian and foreign) and fabric toys, which are being permanently increased.

Having united artists, art critics and pedagogues around it, the Saint-Petersburg Museum takes part in working out interesting exhibition programs and artistic festivals, orientated on a broad age diapason of participators and visitors.

The Museum is not aimed purely at children, and works with other institutions to teach educational programmes.

Russian artists working in the genre of toys 
 Oleg Buryan
 Katya Medvedeva

See also
List of museums in Saint Petersburg

References

External links 

 ITAR-TASS: "Soviet Era Toys Displayed in St. Petersburg"
 Pravda: "Teddy Bear Turns 100"
  Encyclopaedic references. New Feature Petersburg
  Saint Petersburg Toy Museum
  NUK «St. Petersburg Museum of Toys»
  Where is the house ...
  “Not-naiv-toys done by Buryan” - solo show of Oleg Burian
  Exhibition of the author's toys from the museum collection

Museums in Saint Petersburg
Museums established in 1997
Toy museums